Yahya Al-Ghahes (born 19 February 1986) is a Saudi Arabian sprinter who specializes in the 100 metres.

He won the 2003 World Youth Championships, finished fifth at the 2004 World Junior Championships and won the 2005 Asian Championships.

His personal best times are 6.56 seconds in the 60 metres, achieved in October 2007 in Macau; 10.28 seconds in the 100 metres, achieved in September 2005 in Radès; and 21.51 seconds in the 200 metres, achieved in February 2003 in Qatif.

References

1986 births
Living people
Saudi Arabian male sprinters
Athletes (track and field) at the 2006 Asian Games
Athletes (track and field) at the 2002 Asian Games
Asian Games competitors for Saudi Arabia
20th-century Saudi Arabian people
21st-century Saudi Arabian people